The Sheraton Tripoli Hotel is a partially-completed luxury hotel in Libya's capital Tripoli in the Gergarish District. It was incomplete when the Libyan Civil War broke out in February 2011. Construction was halted and the structure has been abandoned. It sits directly next to the Four Points by Sheraton Tripoli Hotel.

References

Hotels in Tripoli, Libya
Defunct hotels